Koelle is a German surname. It may refer to:

Fritz Koelle (1895–1953), German sculptor
Heinz-Hermann Koelle (1925–2011), German aerospace engineer and pilot
Johann Ludwig Christian Koelle (1763–1797), German physician and botanist
Sigismund Koelle (1820–1902), German Christian missionary and linguist
Arthur Gaylord Koelle (1934-2016), Orange County Judge, District Attorney